Sokka irti is the seventh studio album by Finnish rapper Cheek. It was released on 16 April 2012. The album peaked at number three on the Official Finnish Album Chart, and according to IFPI Finland, 27,467 copies of the album were sold during 2012.

Singles
Five singles were released from the album; "Pyrkiny vähentää" (featuring Spekti), "Sokka irti", "Syypää sun hymyyn" (featuring Yasmine Yamajako), "Anna mä meen" (featuring Jonne Aaron) and "Kyyneleet (featuring Sami Saari).

Track listing

Charts

Release history

References

2012 albums
Cheek (rapper) albums